is the 14th single by Japanese singer Yōko Oginome. Written by Masao Urino and Nobody, the single was released on January 21, 1988, by Victor Entertainment.

Background and release
The song was used as the theme song of the TV Asahi drama special , which also starred Oginome.

The music video features Oginome performing the song with a group of American dancers at a dance hall.

The B-side is a cover of The Hollies' hit single "Bus Stop".

"Stranger Tonight" became Oginome's second No. 1 single on Oricon's singles chart. It also sold over 143,000 copies. In addition, the single earned Oginome the Gold Award at the 30th Japan Record Awards and the Best Kayo Music Award at the 17th FNS Music Festival.

Track listing

Charts
Weekly charts

Year-end charts

References

External links

1988 singles
Yōko Oginome songs
Japanese-language songs
Japanese television drama theme songs
Songs with lyrics by Masao Urino
Victor Entertainment singles
Oricon Weekly number-one singles